Koshovo is a rural locality (a village) in Krasavinskoye Rural Settlement, Velikoustyugsky District, Vologda Oblast, Russia. The population was 25 as of 2002.

Geography 
Koshovo is located 17 km northeast of Veliky Ustyug (the district's administrative centre) by road. Bushkovo is the nearest rural locality.

References 

Rural localities in Velikoustyugsky District